Bastrop is a city and the county seat of Bastrop County, Texas, United States. The population was 9,688 according to the 2020 census.

History
Spanish soldiers lived temporarily at the current site of Bastrop as early as 1804, when a fort was established where the Old San Antonio Road crossed the Colorado River and named Puesta del Colorado.

Bastrop's namesake, Felipe Enrique Neri, Baron de Bastrop, was a commoner named Philip Hendrik Nering Bogel, who was wanted for embezzlement in his native country of the Netherlands. In Texas, he assisted Moses and Stephen F. Austin in obtaining land grants in Texas and served as Austin's land commissioner. In 1827, Austin located about 100 families in an area adjacent to his earlier Mexican contracts. Austin arranged for Mexican officials to name a new town there after the baron who died the same year.

On June 8, 1832, the town was platted along conventional Mexican lines, with a square in the center and blocks set aside for public buildings. The town was named Bastrop, but two years later, the Coahuila y Tejas legislature renamed it Mina in honor of Francisco Javier Mina, a Mexican revolutionary hero and martyr. The town was incorporated under the laws of the Republic of Texas on December 18, 1837, and the name was changed back to Bastrop.

Overlooking the center of the town is the Lost Pines Forest. Composed of loblolly pines (Pinus taeda), the forest is the center of the westernmost stand of the southern pine forest. As the only timber available in the area, the forest contributed to the local economy. Bastrop began supplying Austin with lumber in 1839 and then San Antonio, the western Texas frontier, and parts of Mexico.

A fire in 1862 destroyed most of downtown Bastrop's commercial buildings and the county courthouse. As a result, most current downtown structures postdate the Civil War. In 1979, the National Register of Historic Places admitted 131 Bastrop buildings and sites to its listings. This earned Bastrop the title of the "Most Historic Small Town in Texas".

The first edition of the Bastrop Advertiser and County News (now The Bastrop Advertiser) was published on March 1, 1853, giving it claim to be the oldest continuously published weekly (semiweekly since September 5, 1977) in Texas. The wider Bastrop County is also covered by papers such as the Elgin Courier.

On September 4, 2011, two wildfires started when trees fell on power lines. The two fires merged into the Bastrop County Complex fire. This was the worst and most destructive wildfire in Texas history, as it destroyed 1,691 homes, killed two people, and caused $325 million of insured property damage. The drought in Texas at the time combined with strong winds from the Gulf of Mexico caused by Tropical Storm Lee helped fuel the fire.

Geography
Bastrop is located near the center of Bastrop County along the lower Colorado River. The downtown business district of the city is located on a bluff on the east bank of the river, but the city extends to the west side of the river, as well.

Three miles (5 km) northeast of the town, Lake Bastrop is a  reservoir on Spicer Creek operated by the Lower Colorado River Authority (LCRA) since its impounding in 1964. Although primarily used as a cooling pond for the Sim Gideon Power Plant, the lake is also used for recreation, and the LCRA maintains two public parks on the lake.

Climate

Bastrop tends to be cooler than other central Texas cities, but can reach 100 °F in the summer. Extreme temperatures range from –1 to 111 °F.

Demographics

2020 Census

As of the 2020 United States census, there were 9,688 people, 3,188 households, and 2,022 families residing in the city.

2000 Census
As of the census of 2000,  5340 people resided in Bastrop, in 2034 households and 1336 families. The population density was 734.8 people per square mile (283.6/km2). The 2,239 housing units averaged 308.1 per square mile (118.9/km2). The racial makeup of the city was 72.3% White, 17.0% African American, 1.0% Asian, 0.7% Native American, 7.0% from other races, and 1.9% from two or more races. About 17.8% of the population was Hispanic or Latino of any race.

Of the 2,034 households, 32.8% had children under the age of 18 living with them, 46.6% were married couples living together, 15.3% had a female householder with no husband present, and 34.3%  were not families. About 29.4% of all households were made up of individuals, and 12.6% had someone living alone who was 65 years of age or older. The average household size was 2.46 and the average family size was 3.05.

In the city, the population was distributed as 25.5% under the age of 18, 8.3% from 18 to 24, 29.6% from 25 to 44, 21.8% from 45 to 64, and 14.8% who were 65 years of age or older. The median age was 36 years. For every 100 females, there were 97.0 males. For every 100 females age 18 and over, there were 91.2 males.

The median income for a household in the city was $40,212, and for a family was $49,258. Males had a median income of $34,388 versus $27,582 for females. The per capita income for the city was $19,862; 11.7% of the population and 10.1% of families were below the poverty line. Of the total population, 15.6% of those under the age of 18 and 13.6% of those 65 and older were living below the poverty line.

Economy
As of 2020, the area's four largest employers are the Bastrop Independent School District, Hyatt Regency Lost Pines Resort and Spa, Bastrop County government, and MD Anderson Cancer Center.

The Hyatt Regency Lost Pines Resort and Spa (situated about 15 mi west of the City of Bastrop on 405 acres), opened on June 2, 2006, with 491 rooms and gave a boost to employment and sales tax in the area. When the property changed ownership in 2011, officials stated it employed 600 individuals plus 175 additional seasonal employees - making it the largest private employer in Bastrop County.

Government and infrastructure
Federal Correctional Institution Bastrop, a prison of the Federal Bureau of Prisons, is in nearby Camp Swift.

Education

The Bastrop Independent School District serves Bastrop. Some residents are zoned to Mina Elementary School, while others are zoned to Emile Elementary School. All residents are zoned to Bastrop Intermediate School, Bastrop Middle School, and Bastrop High School.

Austin Community College conducts night and continuing-education classes at Bastrop High School.

From 1893 until 1969, Emile High School served as the segregated black high school.

Notable people

Carolyn Banks, fiction writer
Trent Brown, offensive tackle in the NFL for the New England Patriots
John Wheeler Bunton, Texas pioneer and signatory of the Texas Declaration of Independence
Geoff Connor, former Texas Secretary of State, American public servant, attorney, historian, and businessman
Greenleaf Fisk (1807–1888), a legislator in the Republic of Texas and Bastrop County chief justice, he later moved to Brown County and became known as the "Father of Brownwood."
Ryan Holiday, author and owner of The Painted Porch bookstore
Richard Linklater, director and writer
Michael Moorcock, science fiction/fantasy writer
Thomas R. Phillips, former Texas Supreme Court Chief Justice
Rodney Reed, Texas death row inmate
Billy Waugh, former American Special Forces sergeant major and CIA paramilitary operations office
Lovie Yancey, African-American founder of international burger chain Fatburger

Film industry

Several movies were at least partially filmed in Bastrop, including Lovin' Molly (1974), the original The Texas Chain Saw Massacre (1974), Home Fries (1998), Courage Under Fire (1996), and the 2004 remake of The Alamo. Other projects include All The Boys Love Mandy Lane (2006) and Fireflies in the Garden (2008), starring Willem Dafoe and Julia Roberts.

The remake of Friday the 13th was also partially filmed in Bastrop. Filmed in and near Bastrop were The Life of David Gale with Kevin Spacey and Kate Winslet, Michael 1996 with John Travolta, Andie MacDowell and William Hurt, Hope Floats 1998 With Sandra Bullock and Harry Connick Jr., True Women 1998 (TV movie) with Angelina Jolie, Dana Delany, and Michael York,  The Tree of Life 2010 with Brad Pitt and Sean Penn, and Bernie 2010 with Jack Black, Shirley MacLaine, and Matthew McConaughey.

Also partially filmed near Bastrop on the Buck Steiner Ranch was A Perfect World with Kevin Costner, Clint Eastwood, and Laura Dern. In late 2012 and early 2013, the film Joe Ransom starring Nicolas Cage was partially filmed in Bastrop at the Lost Pines Boy Scout Park. Prince Avalanche (2013) starring Paul Rudd and Emile Hirsch was shot in Bastrop after the Bastrop County Complex fire. Boyhood (2014) starring Patricia Arquette and Ethan Hawke was shot in the Lost Pines of Bastrop.

See also
 National Register of Historic Places listings in Bastrop County, Texas
 Recorded Texas Historic Landmarks in Bastrop County

References

External links

 City of Bastrop official website
 Handbook of Texas Online article

Cities in Texas
Cities in Bastrop County, Texas
County seats in Texas
Greater Austin
1827 establishments in Mexico